Samsam Kandi (also Romanized as Şamşām Kandī; also known as Şamşām) is a village in Sina Rural District, in the Central District of Varzaqan County, East Azerbaijan Province, Iran. At the 2006 census, its population was 41, in 10 families.

References 

Towns and villages in Varzaqan County